Brachyloma is a genus  of shrubs in the family Ericaceae. The genus is endemic to Australia.

Species include:
Brachyloma ciliatum (R.Br.) Benth.
Brachyloma concolor (F.Muell.) Benth. 
Brachyloma daphnoides (Sm.) Benth. - daphne heath
Brachyloma delbi Cranfield
Brachyloma depressum (F.Muell.) Benth.
Brachyloma ericoides (Schltdl.) Sond.
Brachyloma mogin Cranfield 
Brachyloma nguba Cranfield 
Brachyloma preissii Sond.
Brachyloma saxicola J.T.Hunter
Brachyloma scortechinii F.Muell.

The genus was formally described in 1845 by German botanist Otto Wilhelm Sonder.

References

Epacridoideae
Ericaceae genera
Taxa named by Otto Wilhelm Sonder